Evolutional Ethics and Animal Psychology is an 1897 book by the American scholar and early animal rights advocate Edward Payson Evans, which argues for the use of animal psychology as the basis for animal rights in the historical evolution of ethics.

Summary 
The book is divided into two parts: "Evolutional Ethics" and "Animal Psychology". The first part covers tribal society ethics, religious belief as a source of moral obligation, ethical relations of humans to other animals and metempsychosis. The second part compares the minds of humans and other animals, progress and perfectibility in lower animals, ideation in humans and other animals, speech as a barrier between humans and other animals and the aesthetic sense and religious sentiment in animals.

Reception 
David Irons described the book as "an interesting, if rather popular and discursive, treatment of one of the applications of the theory of evolution." A review in the Journal of Education described the book as "an interesting and important contribution to the fascinating discussion of the relation of animal species and human races to each other."

Carl Evans Boyd was critical of the book's use of stories about animal intelligence which lacked "insufficient as a basis for generalization." Boyd also criticized Evans for a "failure to recognize that if expatriation be a natural right, it is a right only as against the state of origin, and can have no reference to any other state." Edmond Kelly criticized Evans' use of disputed Lamarckian theory in the book.

In a revised edition of Animals' Rights: Considered in Relation to Social Progress, published in 1922, Henry Stephens Salt cited Evan's book as an example of how the long-held distinction between human and non-human animal intelligence has been challenged by recent writers. Salt also drew attention to Evans' claim that humans need to move past anthropocentric conceptions that treat humans as fundamentally different and separate to all other sentient beings and that, as a result, no moral obligations are required towards them.

Writing in 1989, R. J. Hoage described the book as, in the 90 years since its publication, remaining unequaled in its scholarship and insight on the topics of evolutionary ethics and the ethical treatment of animals.

See also 
 Moral circle expansion
 The Universal Kinship
 The Expanding Circle

References

External links 
 

1897 non-fiction books
Animal ethics books
Books about animal rights
Books about evolution
D. Appleton & Company books
English-language books
Psychology books